Richard Dudley Baker (born March 30, 1936) is an American Soto Zen master (or roshi), the founder and guiding teacher of Dharma Sangha—which consists of Crestone Mountain Zen Center located in Crestone, Colorado and the Buddhistisches Studienzentrum (Johanneshof) in Germany's Black Forest. As the American Dharma heir to Shunryu Suzuki, Baker assumed abbotship of the San Francisco Zen Center (SFZC) shortly before Suzuki's death in 1971. He remained abbot there until 1984, the year he resigned his position after it was disclosed in the previous year that he and the wife of one of SFZC's benefactors had been having an ongoing affair. Despite the controversy connected with his resignation, Baker was instrumental in helping the San Francisco Zen Center to become one of the most successful Zen institutions in the United States.

Early life and practice
Richard Baker was born in Biddeford, Maine, on March 30, 1936, the son of Harold Baker and Elisabeth Dudley. Because his family moved around frequently, he lived in Cambridge, Massachusetts, Indiana, and Pittsburgh growing up. A descendant of Thomas Dudley, Baker was raised in a family of moderate wealth. He attended Harvard University, where he studied architecture and history. He then arrived in San Francisco, California in 1960—beginning to sit with Shunryu Suzuki in 1961. Baker was ordained a Sōtō priest by Suzuki in 1966 just before the opening of Tassajara Zen Mountain Center. Baker was instrumental in orchestrating the acquisition of Tassajara, raising $150,000 for the purchase in a short period of time. From 1968 to 1971, he traveled to Japan to practice at the primary Sōtō monasteries there, including Antaiji, Eiheiji, and Daitokuji.

San Francisco Zen Center

Baker received Dharma transmission from Suzuki in 1970, and then was installed as abbot of San Francisco Zen Center during the "Mountain Seat Ceremony" on November 21, 1971. Baker also penned the introduction to Suzuki's famous book, Zen Mind, Beginner's Mind. Within a very short period of time Baker broadened the scope of SFZC, starting first with the acquisition of Green Gulch Farm in southern Marin county, in 1972.

San Francisco Zen Center expanded quickly with Baker at the helm. In fifteen years, the Center's annual budget increased from $6,000, to $4 million. It acquired property worth around $20 million and built up a network of affiliated businesses staffed by Zen Center students, which included the vegetarian Greens Restaurant in Fort Mason, a bakery, and a grocery store.  In the midst of the growth, Baker became a popular public figure. Although his salary was reportedly modest, he lived a lifestyle which many perceived as extravagant.  With so many students and so much public attention, some felt Baker became less available to the members of the community.  All of this discontent emerged when it was made public that Baker had allegedly been having an affair with the wife of an influential sangha member.

Resignation

Although Baker claimed that his relationship with the woman was a love-affair which had not yet been consummated, the outcry surrounding the incident led to a series of accusations of impropriety on Baker's part, including the admissions by several female members of the community that they had had affairs with Baker before or during his tenure as abbot. The community's sense of crisis sharpened when the woman's husband, one of SFZC's primary benefactors, threatened to hold the organization legally responsible for its abbot's apparent misconduct.

These revelations led to community-wide pandemonium, and in 1984 Baker was forced to resign as abbot. However, San Francisco Zen Center's website now comments: "Although the circumstances leading to his resignation as abbot in 1984 were difficult and complex, in recent years, there has been increased contact; a renewal of friendship and dharma relations." And Baker, for his part, is quoted as having said in a 1994 interview with Sugata Schneider:
I don't think that the gossipy or official versions of what happened are right, but I feel definitely that if I were back in the situation again as the person I am now, it wouldn't have happened.  Which means it's basically my fault.  I had a kind of insecurity and self-importance, which I didn't see for a long time, that was a bad dynamic in the community.

In 1983 Tenshin Reb Anderson received shiho (Dharma Transmission) from Richard Baker. Anderson succeeded him as abbot, and later co-abbot.

In the late-1980s Baker also gave shiho to Issan Dorsey, whom he had ordained as a priest in 1975.  Dorsey went on to serve as abbot of the Hartford Street Zen Center in San Francisco, where he worked to develop hospice care for AIDS patients.

Dharma Sangha
Following his departure from the San Francisco Zen Center in 1984, Baker relocated to Santa Fe, New Mexico where he founded a new community known as Dharma Sangha. One student who followed him to his new community was the priest Philip Whalen (ordained by Baker as a priest in 1973), who became tanto (head monk) of the new center. In July 1987 Baker gave Dharma transmission to Whalen; Whalen later became abbot of the Hartford Street Zen Center (following the tenure of Issan Dorsey) in the Castro district of San Francisco. After the founding of Dharma Sangha in New Mexico, Baker met with William Irwin Thompson, the founder of the Lindisfarne Association. At a meeting of the Board of Directors of Lindisfarne at the Cathedral of St. John the Divine in New York, Thompson convinced the board to donate the campus that he had established—with its passive solar Lindisfarne Fellows House, Founder's House, and Lindisfarne Chapel—to Baker-roshi's Dharma Sangha.  Baker then moved to Crestone, Colorado and Germany to found other practice sites for Dharma Sangha. Baker also gives seminars at Boulder Zen Center in Boulder, Colorado twice each year, typically on the last weekends of January and April.

A once controversial figure, Richard Baker was publicly criticized for his behavior at San Francisco Zen Center. Former students have said that he was addicted to power, abusive of his position, extravagant in his personal spending, and inappropriate in his love life.

In the twenty-five years since leaving San Francisco Zen Center, Baker has continued his career as a Zen teacher, founding and developing two practice centers. Thich Nhat Hanh wrote of Baker, "To me, he embodies very much the future of Buddhism in the West with his creative intelligence and his aliveness."

Family
On September 25, 1999 in Salem, Baker married Marie Louise, daughter of Maximilian, Margrave of Baden, and grandniece of Elizabeth II and Prince Philip, Duke of Edinburgh. They have a daughter, Sofia Baker, born on March 1, 2001, in Alamosa, Colorado. He has two daughters, Sally and Elizabeth, from a prior marriage to Virginia Baker. Elizabeth is married to Jason Kibbey.

Collected works

Books
 (Out of Print)

Audio

See also
 Householder in Buddhism
 Index of Buddhism-related articles
 Schools of Buddhism
 Secular Buddhism
 Timeline of Zen Buddhism in the United States

Citations

General references 
 Lee, Paul; Rosenblum, Paul; McClure, Michael; Whalen, Philip; (2006). Roundabout Zen: Recollections in Celebration of the 70th birthday of Zentatsu Baker Roshi. OCLC 952592911.

External links
 Dharma Sangha, European website
 Zentatsu Richard Baker page on the Crestone Mountain Zen Center website
 Richard Baker and the Myth of the Zen Roshi

1936 births
American Zen Buddhists
Harvard University alumni
Living people
People from Biddeford, Maine
Religious leaders from the San Francisco Bay Area
Rōshi
San Francisco Zen Center
Soto Zen Buddhists
Zen Buddhism writers
Zen Buddhist abbots